Choqa Ginu (also Romanized as Choqā Gīnū) is a village in Mahidasht Rural District, Mahidasht District, Kermanshah County, Kermanshah Province, Iran. At the 2006 census, its population was 254, in 61 families.

References 

Populated places in Kermanshah County